First We Take Brooklyn, also known as Brooklyn Guns, is a 2018 American crime thriller drama film directed by Danny A. Abeckaser and starring Abeckaser, AnnaLynne McCord and Harvey Keitel.

Plot
Mikki Levy is stunned when he's granted an early release from an Israeli prison, and he soon moves in with his uncle in New York City. Unfortunately, he eventually becomes embroiled in a conflict with the Russian mob, which elicits memories of the lengths he went to in order to survive in prison.

Cast
Danny A. Abeckaser as Mikki Levy
AnnaLynne McCord as Esther
Harvey Keitel as Anatoly
Charlotte McKinney as Julie
Kathrine Narducci as Gale
Stevie Guttman as Mendel
Kyle Stefanski as Ahmed

References

External links
 
 

2018 films
American crime thriller films
American crime drama films
2010s English-language films
2010s American films